Ricardo Sala Gaitán is a Colombian industrial engineer and politician.

Ambassadorship
On 17 March 1992, President César Gaviria Trujillo designated Sala as Ambassador of Colombia to Germany. Sala presented his Letters of Credence to Richard von Weizsäcker, President of Germany, on 27 April 1992 at the Hammerschmidt Villa. On 27 January 1996, as a result of the public events that surrounded the 8000 Process scandal, Sala resigned his Ambassadorship in protest against the then President of Colombia Ernesto Samper Pizano.

Personal life
He married. and later divorced, Patricia Eugenia Cárdenas Santa María with whom he had three children: María Paula, Ana Daniela, and Juan Felipe.

References

Year of birth unknown
University of Los Andes (Colombia) alumni
Colombian industrial engineers
Colombian Liberal Party politicians
Ambassadors of Colombia to Germany